Champion Sound is the only studio album by the duo Jaylib (hip hop musicians J Dilla and Madlib).  Half of the songs are produced by Madlib and feature J Dilla on vocals, and the other half are produced by J Dilla and feature Madlib on vocals.

History 

Jaylib began in 2000 when DJ J Rocc of the Beat Junkies gave a CD of unused instrumental tracks by J Dilla to Madlib. Madlib recorded vocals over these beats and labelled them "Jaylib", without the intention of actually releasing them. Stones Throw Records placed one of these recordings as the B-side to a promo 12" Madlib single, under the name Jaylib, which was eventually heard by Dilla.  The pair recorded Champion Sound in separate cities, Madlib in Oxnard, California, and Dilla in Detroit, Michigan by sending recordings back and forth. The two met only once before or during this time, while Madlib was recording in Detroit for J Dilla's album The Diary on MCA Records; a record that was not released until 2016. The album was released in 2003 after much delay due to leaks and bootlegs and received positive reviews.

Following Dilla's move from Detroit to Los Angeles in 2004, they appeared together on tour in Spring 2004 in Los Angeles, San Francisco, New York City, and Toronto.  Madlib debuted a yet-unreleased Jaylib song on a BBC radio show in May  2005 titled "Take It Back aka The Unofficial", produced by J Dilla with vocals by Madlib. The track was released on Adult Swim and Stones Throw's Chrome Children compilation.

Releases 

The first pressings of the album in the USA contained two bonus tracks:  "Raw Addict," and "Ice" (which otherwise are only on a white label 12" issued by Stones Throw); the first pressing of the CD in Europe included those two and a third track, "Pillz," which was later featured as the b-side to the  single for "McNasty Filth".

In 2005 Madlib's compilation of unreleased Jaylib tracks got leaked as an early version of Madvillain's Madvillainy did before. These two CDs were compiled by Madlib in late 2002 to listen to on a trip to Brazil.  The Jaylib compilation is called The Rough Drafts and the Madvillain compilation is called Madvillainy Preview.

The 2007 re-issue of Champion Sound was abruptly delayed when Stones Throw was issued a cease-and-desist from the camp of artist Cris Williamson. "The Red", one of the more popular songs from the LP, contained an unauthorized sample of her song "Shine On, Straight Arrow". According to J-Rocc of the Beat Junkies, the sample clearance issue came down to Williamson's gripe about a Madlib lyric: "There's a Jaylib track called ‘The Red’ they got sued for. Cris Williamson is the artist and she’s a total feminist, a real woman-power type. In that song Madlib says "mostly shitty women". She said, 'I’m not having that, take it off the album.' But she’s still letting them use the instrumental for licensing and so on. So even there they’ve worked something out". "The Red" appears on the reissue with an alternate beat, though one still arranged by Jay Dee. An alternate beat was also used for the song "No Games" on the re-issue.

Reception 
In 2010, Champion Sound was listed by Black Milk as one of the "Top Ten Albums of the Last Decade". In 2015, it ranked at number 41 on Facts "100 Best Indie Hip-Hop Records of All Time" list. In that year, it was also listed by HipHopDX as one of the "30 Best Underground Hip Hop Albums Since 2000".

Track listing

References

External links 
 

2003 debut albums
J Dilla albums
Madlib albums
Stones Throw Records albums
Albums produced by J Dilla
Albums produced by Madlib
Collaborative albums